Garbade as a surname may refer to:

Theodore Garbade (1873–1961), German merchant and banker in Cuba
Daniel Garbade (born 1957), Swiss painter, illustrator, art director and publisher

Surnames
German-language surnames
Lists of people by surname